Darmiya or Darma is a Sino-Tibetan language spoken in the Darma Valley, Dharchula Tehsil, Pithoragarh District of the Indian state of Uttarakhand. It is one of the fifteen tribes, as stated in The Constitution (Scheduled Tribes) Uttar Pradesh Order, 1967 (C.O. 78) in clause (1) of Article 342 of the Constitution of India. Majorly it is called Bhotia; Bhotia is the broad term used in Himalayan region: several communities and languages are considered under this term. This tribal language is the member of west Tibeto-Burman language family in the Himalayan region of Uttarakhand. It is related to Rangas, Rongpo, Chaudangsi, and Byangsi. Alternate names for this language include Darma, Darma Lwo, Darma-Lwo, Darmani, Saukas, and Shaukas.

Information about the language was first published in Grierson's Linguistic Survey of India, and it has been studied by Krishnamurti, Cristina Wills, K. Srikumar, Kavita Rastogi, Ashish Kumar Pandey and Vishnu Singh.

Darmiya language has 34 phonemes in which 8 vowels and 28 consonants have occurred, there are five long vowels and three short vowels.

Geographical distribution 
Darmiya is spoken in the Dhauli valley, from Tawaghat near Dharchula south to Sipoo in the north along Dhauli river. This area is located in Dharchula and Munsiyari tehsils, Pithoragarh district, Uttarakhand, India. Darmiya is spoken in Dar, Bongling, Selachal, Nanglin, Baling, Dugtu, Saung, Baun, Philam, Datu, Gwo, Marchha, Dhakar, Sobla, and Sipoo villages.

Phonology 
The Darmiya language contains the following consonant phonemes:

The language contains the following vowels:

References

Further reading
 Willis, Christina Marie. A descriptive grammar of Darma: an endangered Tibeto-Burman language.—University of Texas, 2007.

Languages of Uttarakhand
Endangered languages of India
West Himalayish languages